Turning Stones is the title of the seventh album by the British singer-songwriter Judie Tzuke, released in April 1989. It peaked at no.57 on the UK Albums Chart and was Tzuke's last album to reach the UK Top 100 until 2018 when her collaboration with Beverley Craven and Julia Fordham, Woman to Woman, reached no.42 on the chart.

Turning Stones was Tzuke's only album to be released by Polydor Records. Disagreements between her and the label affected her subsequent 1989 concert tour which was cancelled at the last moment, and she left the label soon afterwards.

The album includes the single "We'll Go Dreaming", which peaked at no.96 on the UK Singles Chart, Tzuke's last single to chart to date.

Track listing
Side one
 "We'll Go Dreaming" (Judie Tzuke, Mike Paxman, Paul Muggleton) – 4:45
 "Let Me Be the Pearl" (Tzuke, Paxman) – 5:50
 "Dominique" (Tzuke, Noble) – 5:05
 "Take It All" (Tzuke, Paxman, Muggleton) – 5:16
 "Sound of My Sisters Tears" (Tzuke, Paxman) – 4:45

Side two
"Run to Win" (Tzuke, Paxman, Muggleton) – 4:37
 "Don't Go" (Tzuke, Noble) – 4:50
 "Everything Will Come" (Muggleton, Noble) – 4:20
 "Modern Killers" (Paxman, Muggleton) – 5:10
 "Turning Stones" (Tzuke, Paxman, Muggleton) – 3:10

CD edition bonus track
"All They Can Do Is Talk" (Tzuke, Paxman) – 4:33

Personnel
Band members
Judie Tzuke – vocals
Mike Paxman – guitars, keyboards, programming, producer, engineer
Paul Muggleton – guitars, keyboards, programming, producer, engineer
Bob Noble – keyboards

Additional musicians
Nigel Kennedy – violins
Andy Sheppard – saxophone
John Giblin – bass

Production
Mike Silverston – additional engineering
Stephen W Tayler – mixing
Derek A. Murphy – mixing assistant

References

External links
Official website

Judie Tzuke albums
1989 albums
Polydor Records albums
Albums produced by Mike Paxman